Feltman is a surname. Notable people with the surname include:

Art Feltman, American politician from Connecticut
Charles Feltman, German-American baker who invented the hot dog
Bud Feltman (born 1939), former member of the first United States Olympic luge team
Erika Feltman or Erika Felten, (born 1943), West German sprint canoeist
Jeffrey D. Feltman (born 1959), American diplomat, Assistant Secretary of State for Near Eastern Affairs
Samuel Feltman (1899–1951), Chief of the Ballistic Section of the U.S. Army Ordnance Research and Development Division

See also

Feldman
Feldmann
Feltsman
Fieldsman
Flatman
Veltman